The coat of arms of French Polynesia consists of an outrigger depicted in a disc over a stylized emblem of sun and sea. The Coat of arms is placed prominently in the middle of the flag of French Polynesia.

Description
Adopted 23 November 1984 by the Assembly of French Polynesia, at the same time as the flag in which the arms have centre place, the coat of arms shows a stylized Polynesian sailing canoe, a Tahitian and national traditional symbol. It is encircled by a rising sun in the upper half, and by waves in the lower one. The five asterisks represents the five Archipelagos: the Society Islands, the Tuamotus, the Gambier Islands, the Austral Islands and the Marquesas.

Historical Emblem

The arms of Polynésie Française were adopted by letter of  Governor Jean Chastenet de Géry dated 14 September 1939.

See also
Flag of French Polynesia
National emblem of France

References

External links

French Polynesia
National symbols of French Polynesia
French Polynesia
French Polynesia
French Polynesia